The Quebec City Area (or Région de Québec in French) is the metropolitan area surrounding Quebec City, in the Canadian province of Quebec. It consists of two administrative regions: Capitale-Nationale and Chaudière-Appalaches.

Population
The Quebec City Area had a population of 682,757 in the Canada 2001 Census. The Quebec City Area had a population of 715,515 in the Canada 2006 Census. The Quebec-Levis area had a population of 1,109,184 in 2006. In 2011, the Quebec City area, consisting of the  Capitale Nationale and Chaudière-Appalaches census divisions had a population of 1,111,245

Members

Capitale-Nationale
 Main city: Quebec City

* Wendake is an Indian reserve enclaved within Quebec City.
** L'Île d'Orléans contains six parishes.

Chaudières-Appalaches
 Main city: Lévis

Demographics

References

 
Metropolitan areas of Quebec